Ma Lin is a fictional character in Water Margin, one of the Four Great Classical Novels in Chinese literature. Nicknamed "Iron Flute Deity", he ranks 67th among the 108 Stars of Destiny and 31st among the 72 Earthly Fiends.

Background
Ma Lin, a native of Jiankang Prefecture (present-day Nanjing, Jiangsu), is skilled in martial arts and could fight dozens of men at the same time with a pair of bronze sabres. He is also a good player of dizi (Chinese flute), which earns him the nickname "Iron Flute Deity".  When he first appears in the book, he is the third-ranking chief of the bandit group at Mount Yellow Gate, positioned below Ou Peng and Jiang Jing and above Tao Zongwang.

Joining Liangshan
When Song Jiang is following the outlaws of Liangshan Marsh back to their stronghold after they rescued him at Jiangzhou (江州; present-day Jiujiang, Jiangxi), he comes by Mount Yellow Gate with the group. They are blocked by the four bandit chiefs, who demand to know whether Song is among them. When he steps out to show himself, the four come forward to pay him homage. Their request to join Liangshan is welcomed by Song.

Song Jiang applauds Ma Lin's fighting skill during Liangshan's second offensive on the Zhu Family Manor when he has a dazzling fight with Hu Sanniang.

Campaigns and death 
Ma Lin is appointed as one of the leaders of the Liangshan cavalry after all the 108 Stars of Destiny came together in what is called the Grand Assembly. He participates in the campaigns against the Liao invaders and rebel forces in Song territory following amnesty from Emperor Huizong for Liangshan.

In the attack on Black Dragon Ridge (烏龍嶺; northeast of present-day Meicheng Town, Jiande, Zhejiang) in the campaign against Fang La, Ma Lin is knocked off his horse by the enemy general Bai Qin. Shi Bao, Bai's comrade, slices him in two before he could get on his feet.

References
 
 
 
 
 
 
 

72 Earthly Fiends
Fictional characters from Jiangsu